Hemmesta is a locality situated on the island of Värmdö in Sweden's Stockholm archipelago. From an administrative perspective, it is located in Värmdö Municipality and Stockholm County, and has 5,240 inhabitants as of 2010.

References 

Populated places in Värmdö Municipality